Luo Jianming (Chinese: 罗建明) is a male Chinese weightlifter. He competed at the 1992 Barcelona Olympics, and won a bronze medal in men's 52–56 kg.

References

Chinese male weightlifters
Olympic weightlifters of China
Weightlifters at the 1992 Summer Olympics
Olympic bronze medalists for China
Living people
Olympic medalists in weightlifting
Asian Games medalists in weightlifting
Weightlifters at the 1990 Asian Games
Asian Games bronze medalists for China
Medalists at the 1990 Asian Games
Year of birth missing (living people)
Medalists at the 1992 Summer Olympics
20th-century Chinese people